Elections to the Tripura Legislative Assembly were held in Tripura on 16 February 2023 to elect all 60 members of the Tripura Legislative Assembly. The votes were counted and the results were declared on 2 March 2023.

The Bharatiya Janata Party won a simple majority, defeating its rivals Secular Democratic Forces and the Tipra Motha Party. Tipra Motha Party won 13 seats at its debut and became the largest opposition party in Tripura.

Background
The tenure of 12th Tripura Assembly is scheduled to end on 22 March 2023. The previous assembly elections were held in February 2018. After the election, Bharatiya Janata Party formed the state government, with Biplab Kumar Deb becoming the Chief Minister.

Biplab Kumar Deb resigned from Chief Minister post on 14 May 2022 and he was succeeded by Manik Saha as the new chief minister.

TTAADC elections 
Tripura Tribal Areas Autonomous District Council elections were held in April 2021, in which the Tipraha Indigenous Progressive Regional Alliance won an astounding victory, drubbing both the Bharatiya Janata Party and the Communist Party of India (Marxist), with the TIPRA and its ally the Indigenous Nationalist Party of Twipra winning a total of 18 out of the 28 elected council seats. The BJP was restricted to 9 seats and the CPI(M) was completely washed out, unable to win any seats, losing their supermajority of 100% seats in the council.

Major political defections 
In 2022, 8 National Democratic Alliance (5 Bharatiya Janata Party and 3 Indigenous People's Front of Tripura) MLAs resigned and left the BJP, out of which 4 joined TIPRA, 3 joined the Indian National Congress, and 1 joined the Trinamool Congress (albeit later resigned from the party). There have been defections in the  TTAADC where BJP MDC leader Hangsha Kumar Tripura joined TIPRA.

Schedule
The election schedule was announced by the Election Commission of India on 18 January 2023.

Parties and Alliances

Reports emerged in late January in which the Tipra Motha Party was in talks for a possible alliance with the BJP and IPFT. During this time the Tipra Motha Party and the IPFT held talks for a possible merger. However last minute reports later stated that BJP talks with TMP fell off while BJP announced to continue alliance with IPFT, BJP announced that the party was still against IPFT's demand for Tipraland and that the party would be alloted 6 seats as per the alliance agreement.

Secular Democratic Forces 

In early January reports emerged that the Congress and CPI(M) had begun talks of a possible alliance between the parties to unitedly defeat the incumbent government (NDA). Congress and CPI(M) had initially held talks with the Tipra Motha Party however both parties later backed out of the talks as each party did not want to change its ideological stance for the alliance with each other. The TMP later announced it would be contesting alone in the upcoming election while on 14 January 2023, the CPI(M) and the Congress announced to enter into seat sharing agreement for the upcoming assembly elections. General Secretary of the CPI(M) Sitaram Yechury said the main purpose of organising this united front between opposition parties was to defeat the BJP. On 25 January 2023, Left Front convenor Narayan Kar announced seat sharing formula : CPI(M) - 43 seats, Congress - 13 seats, CPI - 1 seat, RSP - 1 seat, AIFB - 1 seat and independent - 1 seat. After the Congress announced candidates for 17 seats, Left Front filled candidates in all 60 seats (CPIM - 56, CPI - 1, RSP - 1, AIFB - 1, Independent -1). Later after CPI(M) stated it would withdraw 13 candidates and allot the seats to the INC, however INC stated they were looking for 17 seats. Post discussions INC agreed to 13 seats however they were given preference in choosing the seats in which they want to contest.

Purushuttam Roy Barman, independent candidate of SDF from Ramnagar was also supported by the Tipra Motha Party against the BJP.



Others

Candidates

Issues

10323 Teachers batch 
In 2017, a Tripura High Court order was confirmed by a Supreme Court bench that declared the recruitment of teachers in batches between 2010 and 2013 to be "unconstitutional" because of a policy that gave preference to poor and senior candidates. The confirmation had happened a few months before the 2018 Tripura Legislative Assembly election and the Bharatiya Janata Party had promised that the teachers would be retained if they came to power and their jobs would be saved even if they had to resort to amending the constitution. The teachers, numbering 10,323 extended their support to the BJP in the election and were moved to a contractual status for about two years but were then terminated and replaced with new hires. The teachers faced economic hardships after the sacking and many of them have become indebted and have resorted to menial jobs. Of those sacked, 150 have died with 8 of them confirmed to be suicides, including Rumi Debbarma, a Master's degree gold medalist, who was forcefully evicted from an indefinite roadside protest and couldn't take the humiliation of termination.

The teachers had held hundreds of protests, demonstration and rallies, and met with several chief ministers and their cabinets. The protests were met with harsh police actions and cases lodged against several of the teachers. The BJP government in Tripura has shifted its position and refused to reinstate the teachers, one minister Ratan Lal Nath had called them unqualified. 

The Communist Party of India (Marxist) have extended their support to the teachers and promised to reinstate them in its manifesto. To give assurances to their promise, The Left Front has fielded two of the teachers Sudip Sarkar (CPIM) and Satyajit Reang (CPI) as its own candidates from the constituencies of Barjala and Santirbazar respectively. Former chief minister Manik Sarkar has stated that the order was "most unfortunate" as it overturned a policy that they had introduced to help the weaker sections of society and even alleged that the bench was linked to the Sangh Parivar. The Tipra Motha Party and lawyer Kapil Sibal, an independent MP have also extended their support to the teachers.

Tipraland Movement
The Tipraha Indigenous Progressive Regional Alliance (TIPRA) has demanded a separate state called Tipraland. However the ruling party BJP refuses to bifurcate the state. TIPRA party also has won elections in 2021 Tripura Tribal Areas Autonomous District Council election. The TTADC areas have 20 of the 60 Assembly seats in Tripura Legislative Assembly.

Ruling BJP has offered talk with the TIPRA party for their demand. Former Chief Minister Biplab Kumar Deb stated that demands by TIPRA are not possible without BJP. But Chief Minister, Manik Saha said that Tipraland is not possible.

Home Ministry on 25 January 2023 called upon TIPRA leadership to discuss the issue of Greater Tipraland. The talk however did not result in any announcement as the delegates did not reach to any agreement.

Bru refugees 
Bru refugees who are living in shelters are demanding food and monetary help. They are demanding faster rehabilitation.

Campaigns

Bharatiya Janata Party 
Prime Minister Narendra Modi visited Agartala, Tripura on 18 December 2022 and addressed a public meeting. He was welcomed by his supporters at the city. He praised the work done by the BJP government and said that Tripura is becoming logistics hub of northeast India.

Manifesto

 More autonomy to the tribal areas amid a demand for a separate state.
 A meal in Rs. 5.
 Rs. 50,000 to EWS family on birth of girl-child.
 A scooty to meritorious college going girls. 
 Smart phones to 50,000 meritorious students.
 Two free LPG cylinders to the beneficiaries of PM Ujjwala Yojana.
 Land pattas to all eligible landless citizens. 
 Financial assistance of Rs 3,000 per year to landless farmers.
 Annual financial assistance of Rs 5,000 to ST families under Tripura Janjati Bikash Yojana.
 Establishment of Maharaja Bir Bikram Manikya Tribal University in Gandacherra to research, promote and preserve tribal culture and studies.

Communist Party of India (Marxist) 
CPI(M) launched door-to-door campaign against the ‘propaganda’ of BJP’s ‘Good Governance’ on 25 December 2022 and urged people not to establish the BJP government. On 8 January 2023, CPIM leaders appealed people to oust the incumbent government mentioning BJP's 2018 poll promises as 'jumla' (false promise) in a public meeting organised by Centre of Indian Trade Unions.

Manifesto 

CPI(M) released its manifesto on 3 February 2023.

Restoration of democratic, political and religious rights.
200-day work to the poor under MGNREGA.
Bring back the Old Pension Scheme if it came to power. The scheme has been reimplemented in Rajasthan, Chhattisgarh, and Himachal Pradesh.
2.5 lakh (250,000) new jobs in government, semi-government and private sectors in next 5 years.
Free electricity upto 50 units per family.
Two DA hikes for government employees every year based on consumer prime index.
Reinstatement of the 10,323 suspended teachers.
Regularisation of services of contractual employees.
Maximum possible autonomy to the tribal council (TTAADC).
Social pension to seniors (>60 years) earning under ₹1 lakh (100,000 rupees) per year.
Ban on privatisation of educational institutions.
Land allotment to landless people.

Indian National Congress 
The Indian National Congress organised a mega rally in Agartala on 29 December 2022 in which BJP MLA Diba Chandra Hrangkhawl along with 1 BJP & AITC leader joined the Congress. AICC in-charge for Tripura Ajoy Kumar said at the rally, "BJP has so many fathers but we have only one father of the nation - Mahatma Gandhi,". Kumar alleged that the BJP is giving money to young people to join their "Bike Bahini" to unleash panic and assault opposition party leaders and workers.

Manifesto                                             

Old pension scheme for government employees.                                                                        

Free 150 units of electricity. 

50,000 new jobs will be created for agriculture labourers. 

Dearness allowance hike twice a year for government employees. 

Wages of tea cultivators and farmers will be increased based on consumer price index. 

50,000 new government jobs will be created in the next 5 years.

Tipra Motha Party 
TIPRA chief Pradyot Deb Barma in a rally in Agartala on 12 November 2022 said that 2023 is a fight to achieve a permanent constitutional solution in the form of Greater Tipraland. He slammed the BJP for its communal politics. He asserted that regional parties can bring about change and that his party wanted to give a constitutional solution, education, healthcare and jobs to all sections of people. Manikya also emphasized that since when the party had come to power in the TTAADC last year, it has focused on bring real development in the neglected regions.

Manifesto

On 4 February 2023, the Tipra Motha Party released its manifesto.
Speedy public grievance redressal system for citizens.
Hike in budget of TTAADC.
20,000 fresh jobs and opportunities
Land allotment to deprived people.
Setting up of a Tribal University, Agriculture University, Sports University and Buddhist University.
Resolution against Citizenship Amendment Act in state assembly.
Socio-economic survey of all tribes.
Maharani Kanchanprabha Devi Women Empowerment Scheme for small-scale micro industries for production of rignai, risa along with packaged food awareness campaign through state-run schemes.
Rights for LGBTQ individuals. 
30% subsidies for entrepreneurship.

Incidents 
Indian National Congress

On 18 January 2023, the Congress claimed 15 of its workers and functionaries were attacked in Jirania allegedly by BJP workers who pelted stones. The attacked included AICC state-incharge Ajoy Kumar and many others.

Tipra Motha Party

On 19 January 2023, TIPRA Motha worker Pranajit Namasudra died after being attacked by unidentified miscreants in Dhalai. It has been reported that Namasudra and friends were travelling in a car through Bamancherra area when miscreants stopped them then dragged him out and assaulted him. Five persons were arrested by police in relation to the incident.

Survey & Polls 
Election Commission of India had banned opinion polls and exit polls from 14 February till 7:00 pm of 27 February 2023. Controversy erupted in Tripura on 27 February during the polling an exit poll was circulated in social media which favoured BJP, Congress leader Sudip Roy Barman asked ECI to probe and Tipra Motha Party leader Pradyot Bikram Manikya Deb Barma called the exit poll BJP-paid.

Results

Results by alliance and party

Results by district

Results by constituency

Government formation 
Imcumbent Chief Minister Manik Saha gave resignation to Governor Satyadev Narayan Arya and staked claim new government with support of 33 MLAs (32 BJP and 1 IPFT).

Aftermath
After the poll results, severe violence was unleashed on the workers of Left Front and Congress. All these violences were alleged to be done by BJP. The CPI(M) demanded a judicial inquiry into the violence and also wrote to the National Human Rights Commission (NHRC) seeking intervention in the matter. Partido Comunista Português expressed its soldarity with CPI(M), CPI and other democratic and progressive forces in Tripura. A delegation composed of Member of Parliaments from CPI(M), CPI and Congress visited Tripura on 10 March 2023 and met with the affected families and administration officials to assess the situation on the ground.

See Also
2023 elections in India

Notes

References

State Assembly elections in Tripura
2023 State Assembly elections in India